Typhlatya iliffei is a species of basket shrimp in the family Atyidae, and was first described in 1981 by C.W. Hart Junior & Raymond B. Manning. It is found in the Caribbean.

The IUCN conservation status of Typhlatya iliffei is "CR", critically endangered. The species faces an extremely high risk of extinction in the immediate future. The IUCN status was reviewed in 1996.

References

Further reading

 

Atyidae
Articles created by Qbugbot
Crustaceans described in 1981
Taxa named by Raymond B. Manning